Return to the Dark Side of the Moon (subtitled: A Tribute to Pink Floyd) is a tribute album organised by Billy Sherwood, and released in 2006 on Purple Pyramid. It is a re-creation of Pink Floyd's The Dark Side of the Moon, and a sequel to Sherwood's Back Against the Wall, itself a re-creation of Pink Floyd's The Wall. Return to the Dark Side of the Moon, in addition includes an original piece composed by Sherwood (and recorded with Tony Kaye and Robby Krieger) in the style of the original album.

The album features guests mostly from the world of progressive rock, including former Yes members Peter Banks, Geoff Downes, Rick Wakeman, Kaye and Sherwood himself.

Track listing
 "Speak to Me" (Mason) / "Breathe" (Waters, Wright, Gilmour) (featuring Malcolm McDowell, Adrian Belew, Jeff Baxter, Tony Kaye, Alan White, John Giblin) 5:44
 "On the Run" (Waters, Wright, Gilmour) (featuring Larry Fast, Alan White) 3:17
 "Time" (Waters, Wright, Gilmour, Mason) (featuring Gary Green, Billy Sherwood, Michael Sherwood, Robby Krieger, David Sancious, Alan White, Jay Schellen, Colin Moulding, CC White) 6:58
 "The Great Gig in the Sky" (Wright) (featuring Rick Wakeman, CC White, Steve Howe, Jay Schellen, Billy Sherwood) 4:40
 "Money" (Waters) (featuring Tommy Shaw, Peter Banks, Edgar Winter, Gary Green, Billy Sherwood, Mike Baird, Tony Levin) 6:24
 "Us and Them" (Waters, Wright) (featuring John Wetton, Scott Page, Dweezil Zappa, Tony Kaye, Pat Mastelotto, Jimmy Haslip, Bob Kulick, Michael Sherwood) 7:34
 "Any Colour You Like" (Wright, Gilmour, Mason) (featuring Robben Ford, Steve Porcaro, Billy Sherwood, Aynsley Dunbar, Tony Franklin) 4:13
 "Brain Damage" (Waters) (featuring Colin Moulding, Robby Krieger, Geoff Downes, Vinnie Colaiuta, Del Palmer, Michael Sherwood, Billy Sherwood) 3:51
 "Eclipse" (Waters) (featuring Billy Sherwood, Peter Banks, Tony Kaye, Vinnie Colaiuta, John Wetton, CC White) 2:07
 "Where We Belong" (Sherwood) (featuring Billy Sherwood, Robby Krieger, Tony Kaye) 3:56

Track 10 is an "exclusive original bonus track".

Participants
 Peter Banks: guitar
 Jeff Baxter: guitar, pedal steel
 Adrian Belew: vocals
 Mike Baird: drums
 Vinnie Colaiuta: drums
 Geoff Downes: keyboards
 Aynsley Dunbar: drums
 Larry Fast: keyboards
 Robben Ford: guitar
 Tony Franklin: bass
 John Giblin: bass
 Gary Green: guitar
 Jimmy Haslip: bass
 Steve Howe: guitar
 Tony Kaye: keyboards
 Bob Kulick: guitar
 Robby Krieger: guitar
 Tony Levin: bass
 Steve Lukather: guitar
 Malcolm McDowell: vocals
 Pat Mastelotto: drums
 Colin Moulding: vocals, bass
 Scott Page: sax
 Del Palmer: bass
 Steve Porcaro: keyboards
 David Sancious: keyboards
 Jay Schellen: drums
 Tommy Shaw: vocals
 Billy Sherwood: vocals, keyboards, guitar
 Michael Sherwood: vocals
 Rick Wakeman: keyboards
 John Wetton: bass, vocals
 Alan White: drums
 CC White: vocals
 Edgar Winter: sax
 Dweezil Zappa: guitar

Production
Produced & Mixed By Billy Sherwood
Engineers: Billy Sherwood, Rob Audrey, Ken Latchney, Erik Jordan, Andy Partridge, Jeff Knowler
Mastered By Joe Gastwirt

External links
Yescography entry

2005 albums
Tributes to The Dark Side of the Moon